Pseudopostega sectila is a moth of the family Opostegidae. It was described by Donald R. Davis and Jonas R. Stonis, 2007. It is known from Puerto Rico and Tortola in the British Virgin Islands.

The length of the forewings is 3–3.7 mm. Adults have been recorded in July.

Etymology
The species name is derived from the Latin sectilis (meaning cleft, cut, divided) in reference to the diagnostic, deeply divided, or cleft condition of the male vinculum.

References

Opostegidae
Moths described in 2007